The men's triple jump event at the 1970 Summer Universiade was held at the Stadio Comunale in Turin on 4 and 5 September 1970.

Medalists

Results

Qualification
Qualifying distance: 15.30 m

Final

References

Athletics at the 1970 Summer Universiade
1970